U-35 may refer to one of the following German submarines:

 , was a Type U 31 submarine launched in 1914 and that served in the First World War until surrendered on 26 November 1918
 During the First World War, Germany also had these submarines with similar names:
 , a Type UB II submarine launched in 1915 and sunk on 26 January 1918
 , a Type UC II submarine launched in 1916 and scuttled on 17 May 1918
 , a Type VIIA submarine that served in the Second World War until scuttled on 29 November 1939
 , a Type 212 submarine of the German Navy commissioned into service in March 2015.

Submarines of Germany